Coimbatarao Doraikannu "C.D." Gopinath  (born 1 March 1930) is a former Indian Test cricketer.

Biography
Gopinath was born in Madras, and graduated from Madras Christian College. 

Gopinath was a right-handed batsman. He scored 50* and 42 on his Test debut against the English cricket team in 1951–52, batting at No.8 in both innings. He contributed a quick 35 in the final Test of that series when India recorded its first Test victory. He toured England in 1952 and completely failed with the bat. At home he played Tests against Pakistan in 1952–53 and Australia in 1959–60, and toured Pakistan in 1954–55. He was chosen in the team to West Indies in 1952–53 but turned down the invitation. 

Gopinath captained Madras from 1955–56 to 1962–63, as well as South Zone in the Duleep Trophy. In the 1970s, he served as a national selector under Vijay Merchant and later as the chairman, and managed the 1979 tour to England. He averaged more than 50 in the Ranji Trophy with a highest score of 234.

Gopinath is the last surviving member of India's first Test-winning team. He and his wife Comala, a former champion golfer, live in Coonoor in the Nilgiris District of Tamil Nadu. Some sources give the expansion of his first initial as "Chingleput".

References

External links
 Cricinfo Profile
 Cricketarchive Profile

1930 births
Living people
India Test cricketers
Indian cricketers
Tamil Nadu cricketers
South Zone cricketers
Tamil sportspeople
Cricketers from Chennai